The 2016–17 Basketball League of Serbia season is the 11th season of the Basketball League of Serbia, the highest professional basketball league in Serbia. It is also 73rd national championship played by Serbian clubs inclusive of nation's previous incarnations as Yugoslavia and Serbia & Montenegro.

The first half of the season consists of 14 teams and 182–game regular season (26 games for each of the 14 teams) began on October 8, 2016, and ended on April 12, 2017. The second half of the season consists of 4 teams from Adriatic League and the best 4 teams from first half of the season. Playoff starts soon after. The first half is called First League and second is called Super League.

Teams

First League

League table

Results

Statistical leaders

PIR

|}

Points

|}

Rebounds

|}

Assists

|}

Super League

League table

Results

Statistical leaders

PIR

|}

Points

|}

Rebounds

|}

Assists

|}

Playoffs

Semifinals

Game 1

Game 2

Finals

Game 1

Game 2

Game 3

MVP List

MVP of the Round

First League

Super League

Notes

See also
2016–17 Radivoj Korać Cup
2016–17 ABA League

References

External links
 Official website of Serbian Basketball League

Basketball League of Serbia seasons
Serbia
Basketball